Yusuf Ibrahim may refer to:

 Yusuf Ibrahim (doctor) (1877–1953), doctor partially responsible for the description of congenital cutaneous candidiasis, who was also implicated in the Nazi euthanasia program
 Yusuf Ibrahim (footballer) (born 1986), Nigerian footballer
 Yusuf Mahamud Ibrahim, Somali ruler, reigning from 1798 to 1848